These are the current records in the various age groups of masters athletics for United States competitors. Starting at age 35, each age group starts on the athlete's birthday in years that are evenly divisible by 5 and extends until the next such occurrence. For record purposes, older athletes are not included in younger age groups, except in the case of relay team members. A relay team's age group is determined by the age of the youngest member. There are two categories of relay records, one for composite teams made up of four American runners usually National teams at major championships, and a Club record for members of the same club, from the same Association.

Some masters events (hurdles, throwing implements) have modified specifications. The combined events use an age-graded result applied against the standard scoring table.

Based on IAAF rule 260.18a, since 2000, indoor marks superior to the outdoor record are eligible for record purposes. They are noted with an "i"

Men
Key:

Men's 100 meters

Men's 200 meters

Men's 400 meters

Men's 800 meters

Men's 1,500 meters

Men's Mile

Men's 3,000 meters

Men's 5,000 meters

Men's 10,000 meters

Men's 80 meters hurdles

Men's 100 meters hurdles

Men's 110 meters hurdles

Men's 200 meters hurdles

Men's 300 meters hurdles

Men's 400 meters hurdles

Men's 2,000 meters steeplechase

Men's 3,000 meters steeplechase

Men's 4 × 100 meters relay

Men's 4 x 400 meters relay

Men's 4 x 800 meters relay

Men's High jump

Men's Pole vault

Men's Long jump

Men's Triple jump

Men's Shot put

Men's Discus throw

Men's Hammer throw

Men's Weight throw

Men's Superweight throw

Men's Javelin throw

Men's Throws pentathlon

Men's Men's Pentathlon

Men's Ultraweight Pentathlon

Men's Decathlon

Women
Key:

Women's 100 meters

Women's 200 meters

Women's 400 meters

Women's 800 meters

Women's 1,500 meters

Women's Mile

Women's 3,000 meters

Women's 5,000 meters

Women's 10,000 meters

Women's 80 meters hurdles

Women's 100 metres hurdles

Women's 200 metres hurdles

Women's 300 metres hurdles

Women's 400 metres hurdles

Women's 2,000 metres steeplechase

Women's 4 x 100 metres relay

Women's 4 x 400 metres relay

Women's 4 x 800 metres relay

Women's High jump

Women's Pole vault

Women's Long jump

Women's Triple jump

Women's Shot Put

Women's Discus throw

Women's Hammer throw

Women's Weight throw

Women's Superweight throw

Women's Javelin throw

Women's Throws pentathlon

Women's Pentathlon

Women's Ultraweight pentathlon

Women's Heptathlon

Women's Decathlon

References

American Masters Outdoor Track & Field Records

External links
World Masters Athletics Men's Records
World Masters Athletics Women's Records
Masters Athletics All Time World Rankings
Veterans Decathlon Records
European Veterans Championships Records

United States
National records in athletics (track and field)
Track and field in the United States
Track and field, masters athletics
Sports record progressions
Sports records and statistics
Sport of athletics records